Safi Tehsil is a subdivision located in Mohmand District, Khyber Pakhtunkhwa, Pakistan. The population is 99,114 according to the 2017 census.

In 2020 a landslide at a marble mine have been killed at least 19 people and more than 20 people were also injured.

See also 
 List of tehsils of Khyber Pakhtunkhwa

References 

Tehsils of Khyber Pakhtunkhwa
Populated places in Mohmand District